Andrew Douglas Gemmell (born February 20, 1991) is an American competition swimmer who specializes in long-distance freestyle events. He was a member of the 2012 United States Olympic Team, and competed in the 1,500-meter freestyle event at the 2012 Summer Olympics.

Personal life
Gemmell was born in Columbia, Maryland, the son of Bruce, a former captain of the University of Michigan swimming team, and Debra Gemmell. He graduated from Charter School of Wilmington in Wilmington, Delaware in 2009. He is currently married to fellow UGA swimming alum and World Champion, Jordan Mattern.

College career
Gemmell received an athletic scholarship to attend the University of Georgia, where he majored in economics and swam for coach Jack Bauerle's Georgia Bulldogs swimming and diving team in National Collegiate Athletic Association (NCAA) competition in 2010, and again from 2012 to 2014, after red-shirting during the 2010–11 school year.  His personal bests include a 500-yard freestyle time of 4:17.75; a 1,650-yard freestyle time of 14:41.86; and 400-yard individual medley in 3:44.89 (all times from the NCAA Championships).  He completed his senior year in 2013–14.

International career
At the 2008 FINA Youth World Swimming Championships, Gemmell won gold in the boy's 400-meter individual medley.

At the 2009 World Aquatics Championships, Gemmell won silver in the men's 10-kilometer open water race. In the 5-kilometer race, Gemmell finished fifth. Gemmell is a recipient of the United States 2009 male open-water swimmer of the year award, and was nominated for the 2009 Golden Goggle Awards as breakout swimmer of the year. At the 2010 Pan Pacific Swimming Championships, Gemmell placed fifth in the 1,500-meter freestyle and eleventh in the 400-meter individual medley.

At the 2012 U.S. Olympic Trials in Omaha, Nebraska, the U.S. qualifying meet for the 2012 Olympics, Gemmell made the U.S. Olympic team for the first time by finishing first in the 1,500-meter freestyle with a time of 14:52.19. At the 2012 Summer Olympics in London, he placed ninth in the preliminary heats of the 1,500-meter freestyle with a time of 14:59.05, and did not advance among the top eight to the event final.

See also

 List of University of Georgia people

References

External links
  (archive)
 
 
 
 
 
 Andrew Gemmell – University of Georgia athlete profile at GeorgiaDogs.com

1991 births
Living people
American male freestyle swimmers
American long-distance swimmers
Georgia Bulldogs men's swimmers
Olympic swimmers of the United States
Sportspeople from Wilmington, Delaware
Swimmers at the 2012 Summer Olympics
Swimmers at the 2015 Pan American Games
World Aquatics Championships medalists in open water swimming
Pan American Games silver medalists for the United States
Pan American Games medalists in swimming
Medalists at the 2015 Pan American Games
20th-century American people
21st-century American people